In Euclidean space, the distance from a point to a plane is the distance between a given point and its orthogonal projection on the plane, the perpendicular distance to the nearest point on the plane.

It can be found starting with a change of variables that moves the origin to coincide with the given point then finding the point on the shifted plane  that is closest to the origin. The resulting point has Cartesian coordinates :
.

Converting general problem to distance-from-origin problem

Now the problem has become one of finding the nearest point on this plane to the origin, and its distance from the origin.

Restatement using linear algebra
The formula for the closest point to the origin may be expressed more succinctly using notation from linear algebra. The expression  in the definition of a plane is a dot product , and the expression  appearing in the solution is the squared norm .
.

The Euclidean distance from the origin to the plane is the norm of this point,
.

Why this is the closest point
In either the coordinate or vector formulations, one may verify that the given point lies on the given plane by plugging the point into the equation of the plane.

To see that it is the closest point to the origin on the plane, observe that  is a scalar multiple of the vector  defining the plane, and is therefore orthogonal to the plane.
.

Closest point and distance for a hyperplane and arbitrary point

The corresponding Cartesian form is  where .

The closest point on this hyperplane to an arbitrary point  is

.

,
.

Thus in  the point on a plane  closest to an arbitrary point  is  given by

where
,
and the distance from the point to the plane is
.

See also
Distance from a point to a line
Hesse normal form
Skew lines#Distance

References

Euclidean geometry
Distance
Planes (geometry)